Hažlín is a village and municipality in Bardejov District in the Prešov Region of north-east Slovakia.

History
In historical records the village was first mentioned in 1414.

Geography
The municipality lies at an altitude of 270 metres and covers an area of 20.093 km².
It has a population of about 1185 people.

Genealogical resources and facts

The records for genealogical research are available at the state archive "Statny Archiv in Presov, Slovakia"

 Roman Catholic church records (births/marriages/deaths): 1750-1896 (parish A)
 Greek Catholic church records (births/marriages/deaths): 1852-1924 (parish B)

The surname "Hažlínsky" and its variants—e.g., "Haszlinsky" (a Magyar variant)—denote one with roots in Hažlín. According to FamilySearch, the surname first appeared in the 1700s in Gaboltov and not Hažlín. Incidentally, this also makes likely that Mickey Haslin (né "Hazlinsky")'s father, George Hazlinsky, was solely Matrilineally Jewish and not Jewish because of both parents (This is important to note because George Hazlinsky and his brothers were maternal siblings of a Katherine Ushinsky Gajdos, née Uszinskyovà; and she was Jewish through both her own paternal line and her and George's maternal line, that of Zsuzsanna "Anna" Jaszová Haszlinskyová Uszinskyová 

(Among Anna's other children were Katherine's point of contact at Philadelphia, Marion Hazlinski (later Martin Hazlinsky); and Katherine truthfully gave his name, whereas she gave "Maria Uscianski" in order to conceal her Jewish heritage.)

See also
 List of municipalities and towns in Slovakia

References

External links
 
 
Surnames of living people in Hazlin

Villages and municipalities in Bardejov District
Šariš